The Eisenbahn- und Verkehrsgewerkschaft EVG ("railway and transport union") is a German trade union with approximately 204,000 members, which represents most railway-related workers and professionals.

EVG was founded on November 30, 2010 in Fulda as an unification of the existing unions Transnet (210,000 members) and GDBA (30,000 members), which had collaborated since 2005. After a year-long dispute, EVG and German rail operator Deutsche Bahn agreed in 2015 to a wage hike for all 160,000 employees of 3.5 percent, or at least 80 euros more per month; the union had originally called for a wage hike of 6 percent for its workers. In late 2018, EVG again staged a four-hour stoppage that brought long-distance rail traffic to a standstill and disrupted commuter and freight trains; as a result, Deutsche Bahn agreed to a 29-month wage deal, including another 3.5 percent raise.

The EVG is a member of the Confederation of German Trade Unions (DGB).

Like both Transnet and GDBA, EVG is affiliated with the European Transport Workers' Federation and the International Transport Workers' Federation.

References

External links 
 http://www.evg-online.org — official page
 http://www.evg-online.org/EVG/wir/index_html/ — about foundation (German)
 http://www.itfglobal.org/news-online/index.cfm/newsdetail/5433 — about foundation (English)

Trade unions in Germany
Railway unions in Germany
Trade unions established in 2010